Nagaland, a state in north eastern India has had a long association with Jainism. Today the state  has two Jain temples  and has become home to hundreds of Jain families living prosperously and peacefully.

History
The first Jain temple in Nagaland was established in Kohima. The temple was established in 1920 by 8 Sethi families, who were the first non naga settlors in Nagaland, prominent among them being Hardev Sethi, Hiralal Sethi, Phulchand Sethi, Jethmal Sethi, Devalal Sethi. These families then moved to Dimapur in 1944 due to  Japanese invasion during World War II. These families established the Jain temple in Dimapur in 1947.

Dimapur Jain Temple

Dimapur Jain Temple was built in 1947. The temple is architecturally very well built and has an impressive structure. The temple has some intricate glass work. The temple is considered very auspicious by the people of Dimapur.
The Moolnayak of the temple is Lord Mahavira. Dimapur is the business center of Nagaland today and most of the Jain families are settled in Dimapur.

Kohima Jain Temple

The first Jain temple in Nagaland was established in Kohima. The temple was established in 1920

Community
Jains constitute only about 0.1% of the total population of Nagaland yet they control a chunk of the businesses in Nagaland.
The Dimapur Jain community actively participates in various social causes.  They also regularly organize free health camps, relief camps.
The Dimapur Jain community runs the SD Jain Charitable Hospital, SD Jain High School and SD Jain Girls' college. The SD Jain Hospital and the SD Jain School and Jain Bhavan were established as a result of the untiring efforts of Shri Phulchand Sethi, Shri Phulchand Binaykia, Shri Mangilal Chhabra, Shri Jethmal Sethi,  Shri Kanhaiyalal Sethi, Shri Madan Lal Sethi and other Sethi and Chhabra families of Dimapur.

Gallery

Major centers
Major Jain centers include:
Shree Digambar Jain Temple Dimapur
Jain Temple Kohima

Population
According to 2011 census, the population of Jains in Nagaland is 2,093, which is approximately 0.1% of the total population.

Eminent Personalities
Late Phulchand Sethi
Late Jethmal Sethi
Late Champalal Sethi
Late Kanhaiyalal Sethi
Late Mangilal Chabra
Late Subhkaran Sethi
Late Ramchandra Sethi
Binod Sethi

See also

Jainism in India

References

 https://epaper.easternmirrornagaland.com/epaper/edition/381/eastern-mirror-june-21/page/3
 http://www.nagalandpost.com/book-on-jainism-released/235284.html
 https://morungexpress.com/kohima-jain-temple-marks-100th-year-with-book-release
https://www.telegraphindia.com/bihar/deity-gift-from-nagaland/cid/218937
http://www.easternmirrornagaland.com/dimapur-jain-community-observes-paryushan/

Sources  
 Sethi, Raj Kumar (2021), 100 years of Jainism in Nagaland - (A journey from 1885 to 1985), Walnut Publication, 

Jain communities
Jainism in India
Religion in Nagaland
History of Nagaland